Michel Soutter (2 June 1932 – 10 September 1991) was a Swiss film director and screenwriter. He directed 13 films between 1967 and 1991. His 1982 film L'amour des femmes was entered into the 32nd Berlin International Film Festival.

Filmography
 La lune avec les dents (1967)
 Haschisch (1968)
 La pomme (1969)
 James ou pas (1970)
 Les nénuphars (1972)
 Les arpenteurs (1972)
 Ce Schubert qui décoiffe (1973)
 L'escapade (1974)
 Repérages (1977)
 L'amour des femmes (1982)
 Adam et Ève (1983)
 Signé Renart (1984)
 Le film du cinéma suisse (1991)

References

External links

 Michel Soutter at the Swiss Film Directory

1932 births
1991 deaths
Swiss film directors
Swiss screenwriters
Male screenwriters
Film people from Geneva
Deaths from cancer in Switzerland
20th-century screenwriters